Yeongil may also refer to:

Yeon-gil, Chinese Korean transliteration name of Yanji
Yeongil, old name of Pohang